Felidae is a 1989 crime fiction novel by the German-Turkish writer Akif Pirinçci. The main character is a cat named Francis who investigates the murders of several cats in a big city in Germany. There are eight books in the Felidae series: Felidae, Felidae II (also known as Felidae on the Road or, in the original German version, Francis), Cave Canem, Das Duell, Salve Roma!, Schandtat, Felipolis and Göttergleich, of which only Felidae, Felidae II, and Felidae V: Salve Roma! have been translated into English.

Although being primarily a work of crime fiction, the Felidae series discuss many contemporary ethical problems and philosophical questions, such as the relationship between mankind and animals and the idea of superior races within species. Thus, the Felidae series can be considered complex and multi-layered.

Plot
Francis, a European Shorthair, moves to a German neighbourhood with his bumbling owner, Gustav, into a poorly-maintained apartment with bad smells and rotting parquet flooring. Francis soon finds the corpse of another local cat, Sascha. Bluebeard (Blaubart in the original print), a deformed local cat, is convinced that humans (cat slang: "can-openers") are responsible for the death and other recent murders. Francis disagrees with this assessment, convinced that the slash on Sascha's neck was caused by teeth. The discovery of the body marks the start of terrible nightmares that afflict Francis and intertwine him with the murders. Another tomcat, "Deep Purple", is the next victim; while visiting the body, Francis notices Deep Purple's sexually-aroused state, suggesting a murderous femme fatale.

That night, Francis hears loud yowls that are coming from the uninhabited upper floors of his house. He finds a strange religious meeting taking place, in which a cat named Joker preaches about a cat known as Claudandus, a Jesus Christ-like figure, who allegedly sacrificed himself and ascended to Heaven. Meanwhile, cats jump into frayed wires and electrocute themselves. Francis accidentally alerts Joker to his presence, and is chased by the cult members. He escapes and falls through a skylight. He then meets Felicity (Felicitas in the original print), a blind Russian Blue who has heard the murderer and his victims shortly before their death. Additionally, Felicity says that she sees images in her mind alongside feelings of fear and pain. Francis believes that the images are actually memories retained from childhood. After leaving Felicity's home, Bluebeard takes Francis to Pascal, an intelligent Havana Brown who has learned to use his owner's computer. With it, he has compiled a list of the local cats. Francis learns from Pascal that Felicity has just been reportedly murdered; her decapitated head is found while her beloved owner sobs over his pet's death. Francis experiences another nightmare that night, in which a large portrait of Gregor Mendel comes to life and plays with dead cats. Unnerved, Francis hunts for rats to distract himself and finds the journal of a "Professor Julius Preterius", a scientist who used the house as a laboratory years prior. Francis learns that Preterius was attempting to create a flesh-binding glue with assistants Ziebold and Gray, using living cats to test it. The glue is unsuccessful, and, desperate, Preterius uses the glue on a stray cat. Due to a genetic abnormality, the glue seals the wounds on the cat instantly. Preterius names the cat Claudandus ("one who must or should be sealed"). Preterius descends into madness, but continues with his project long after funding ceases and his assistants have left. The journal's last entry reveals that Preterius had heard Claudandus speak to him, and was planning to free the cats.

Francis later encounters the strange Persian Jesaja, who alludes to escaping from Preterius' lab and proclaims to be the Guardian of the Dead. He lives within ancient catacombs, keeping a tomb housing hundreds of cat skeletons. Jesaja says that he serves "the Prophet" (Claudandus), who delivers corpses for him to guard. That night, Francis experiences another dream, this time involving a white cat who states he is Felidae. He is surrounded by hundreds of others, many of whom Francis recognizes. The white cat invites Francis to join them on a journey to Africa. Francis awakes, and answers the call of a female in heat. He inquires about her breed. However, she simply states that her breed has no name, but is both old and new. He later learns from Bluebeard that her race is different, and more wild than standard cats. Francis, Pascal, and Bluebeard continue to research the murders. Joker has gone missing, and cannot be located. The three present this information to the local cats, and Pascal presents a logical explanation that places the blame on Joker. The crowd is placated, but Francis is not; he visits Joker's home. He finds Joker dead among porcelain statues. Unlike previous murders, there appears to have been no struggle. Francis immediately begins to connect his dreams to the murders, and also recalls that Pascal's owner idolizes Mendel, that Pascal offhandedly mentioned his owner's name being Ziebold, and that Pascal spoke of Felidae with yearning. Francis concludes that the murderer is Pascal, who really is Claudandus, and goes to confront him. He finds a program on the computer that catalogues the new breed's genetics and breeding, as well as the cats killed to keep from contaminating the lines. Claudandus reveals himself, explaining that he harbours a deep hatred towards humanity due to the suffering inflicted upon him by Preterius. He had killed Preterius and set the other cats free before being rescued by Ziebold. Claudandus had wanted Francis to take over the program, hoping that the cats would eventually evolve into something capable of overthrowing the human race and all other species which he saw as inferior. Francis and Claudandus begin to battle, with Claudandus accidentally destroying the computer and setting the house afire in the process. Claudandus dies after Francis slits his throat.

In the epilogue, Francis states that he never told any others the true identity of the murderer, and that Joker's name was eventually cleared. Jesaja was coaxed out of the catacombs, and has found a home with a bartender. Francis states that all animals have the ability to lose their innocence and humans, who descended from animals, still carry a hint of innocence. The novel ends with Francis urging the reader to never cease believing in a world where all animals and humans coexist, including those "more sublime and intelligent than the latter--for example, Felidae."

Reception
In Germany, Felidae became a best-seller. The initial print run of the novel in Germany was 7000 copies, but the publisher began producing more after the book's success. Worldwide, Felidae has sold millions of copies.

Felidae has become a censored and banned work in recent years, owing largely to Akif Pirinçci's controversial political presence, which includes profanity and crude humour, right-wing statements and inflammatory remarks about issues such as The Holocaust and the immigration of Islamic refugees. Publisher Random House, the prime distributor for Felidae, cancelled contracts with Pirinçci, ceasing further print production of the book, while commerce giant Amazon removed all print and digital sales pages for the book, except for used copies, which run roughly over US$100 in price. Felidae retains a metadata page on Amazon-owned book review platform Goodreads. The Felidae book itself contains no commentary on Islam or on foreign refugees.

Film adaptations

A German animated film, also called Felidae, produced in 1994 and directed by Michael Schaack was based on the first Felidae novel of the same name. The movie script was co-written by Pirinçci. It was the most expensive animated film produced in Germany, reportedly costing 10 million marks.

References

External links
Kirkus Reviews
Planet Wissen
Die Welt; Toon Company
Die Welt Online
Akif Blog
Publishers Weekly
Ebsco; PW
Ebsco; Book Report
Ebsco; Library Journal
Literature Kritiken review
Treff Punkt review

1989 novels
Crime novels
German novels adapted into films
Novels set in Germany
Novels about cats
Censored books
Talking animals in fiction